Aleksandar Filipović (born 29 May 1992 in Smederevo) is a Serbian rower.

He won a gold medal at the 2012 World Rowing U23 Championships in men's coxed four.

References

1992 births
Living people
Serbian male rowers
Sportspeople from Smederevo
Mediterranean Games silver medalists for Serbia
Competitors at the 2013 Mediterranean Games
Mediterranean Games medalists in rowing
21st-century Serbian people